Alberta Intergovernmental Relations (or the Ministry of Intergovernment Relations) is the Alberta provincial ministry for international relations and relations with the Canadian federal government and the other provincial governments in Canada. Since 2014, it has been held concurrently by the Premier of Alberta.  It was formerly called Alberta International and Intergovernmental Relations

Ministers

 Shirley McClellan, Progressive Conservative (26 May 1999 – 16 March 2001)
 Halvar Jonson, Progressive Conservative (16 March 2001 – 25 November 2004)
 Ed Stelmach, Progressive Conservative (25 November 2004 – 23 March 2006)
 Gary Mar, Progressive Conservative (6 April 2006 – 15 December 2006)
 Guy Boutilier, Progressive Conservative (15 December 2006 – 12 March 2008)
 Ron Stevens, Progressive Conservative (12 March 2008 – 15 May 2009)
 Vacant, under Progressive Conservative Government (15 May 2009 – 17 September 2009; 125 Days)
 Len Webber, Progressive Conservative (17 September 2009 – 15 January 2010)
 Iris Evans, Progressive Conservative (15 January 2010 – 12 October 2011)
 Cal Dallas, Progressive Conservative (12 October 2011 – 15 September 15 2014)
 Jim Prentice, Progressive Conservative (15 September 2014 – 24 May 2015)
 Rachel Notley, New Democratic (24 May 2015 – 30 April 2019)
 Jason Kenney, United Conservative Party (30 April 2019 – 11 October 2022)
 Danielle Smith, United Conservative Party (11 October 2022 - present)

Envoys to the United States
Alberta's envoys to the United States manage the important relationship between Alberta and the US from the Alberta Washington Office within the Canadian embassy. Currently, Gitane De Silva serves as envoy to the United States, or officially as "Senior Representative to the United States". She has held the position since 1 January 2016, taking over from Rob Merrifield, who was appointed as the envoy in September 2014. Previously, Gary Mar has also been envoy to the US, he was appointed 27 September 2007. He resigned the post on 16 March 2011 to contest the provincial Conservative party leadership and later became Alberta's envoy to Asia.

Offices abroad
Through the ministry, Alberta maintains offices and provincial envoys at the Canadian embassies or consulates in Washington, D.C., Chicago, Shanghai, Beijing, Hong Kong, Taipei, Berlin, Mexico City, London, Seoul and Tokyo.

See also
 Foreign relations of Canada
 Ontario Ministry of Intergovernmental Affairs
 Quebec Ministry of International Relations
 Saskatchewan Ministry of Intergovernmental Affairs

References

Intergovernmental Affairs
Foreign relations of Canada
Alberta
Paradiplomacy
1972 establishments in Alberta